The 1995 NCAA Division I softball tournament was the fourteenth annual tournament to determine the national champion of NCAA women's collegiate softball. Held during May 1995, thirty-two Division I college softball teams contested the championship. The tournament featured eight regionals of four teams, each in a double elimination format. The 1995 Women's College World Series was held in Oklahoma City, Oklahoma from May 25 through May 29 and marked the conclusion of the 1995 NCAA Division I softball season.  UCLA won their eighth NCAA championship, and ninth overall, by defeating Arizona 4–2 in the final game.  UCLA pitcher Tanya Harding was named Women's College World Series Most Outstanding Player, the first time the honor was awarded by the NCAA.  The Bruins' participation and championship were later vacated by the NCAA.

Qualifying

Regionals

Regional No. 1

Michigan qualifies for WCWS

Regional No. 2

Princeton qualifies for WCWS

Regional No. 3

Arizona qualifies for WCWS

Regional No. 4

Cal State Fullerton qualifies for WCWS

Regional No. 5

Southwestern Louisiana qualifies for WCWS

Regional No. 6

Iowa qualifies for WCWS, 3–1

Regional No. 7

UNLV qualifies for WCWS

Regional No. 8

UCLA qualifies for WCWS, 3–0

Women's College World Series

Participants
Arizona
UCLA

Bracket

All-Tournament Team
The following players were named to the All-Tournament Team

References

1995 NCAA Division I softball season
NCAA Division I softball tournament